Thatiparthi Jeevan Reddy is an Indian politician who is the current Member of the Telangana Legislative Council from Karimnagar Assembly constituency.

He was first elected as Panchayat Samithi President of Mallial in 1981 in non-party-based elections, which is equivalent to today's Legislative Constituency. He was elected as M.L.A. for the first time from T.D.P. in the year 1983 and was inducted in the State Cabinet with an Excise Minister portfolio. He later differed with N.T.R. and joined the Congress Party under the leadership of late Sree Rajeev Gandhi in the year 1984. He won the elections from the Congress Party in the year 1989, 1996, 1999, 2004 and 2014. In 2019, he was elected as a Member of Legislative Council (Graduate) from Karimnagar Assembly  constituency with a majority of (39,430) votes.

Reddy contested against the T.R.S. Party President in the Parliament by-election in the year 2006 and 2008. In 2008 Parliament elections, he lost marginally with 14,000 only. In 2006 he was inducted into the State Cabinet until 2009 during which he held the portfolio of R&B. After formation of Telangana State he won the only seat from North Telangana for Congress.

Minister in old Andhra Pradesh
He was the Roads and Buildings Minister of Andhra Pradesh from 2007 to 2009. He is a senior member of the Congress Party.

Career
Jeevan Reddy was elected as an MLA for six times consecutively from Jagityal constituency, and was defeated by L. Ramana of the Telugu Desam Party in the 2009 elections.

In 2006 and 2008, he lost Karimnagar by-election to TRS leader, K. Chandrashekhar Rao. And now in 2019 elections he was elected as member of legislative council (MLC) for graduates constituency Karimnagar.

Member of Legislative Assembly

References

Telangana MLAs 2014–2018
Living people
Telugu politicians
1952 births